Wooclap is an interactive electronic platform used to create polls and questionnaires. The site's users answer questions anonymously through technology devices such as smartphones or laptops.

Research

2019-08-01 
According to a study at Lille University with 3 teachers and 75 students from the faculty of pharmacy, they deemed that "smartphone or computer improve their education" and that "students reported higher mean scoring preference for Socrative and Wooclap applications compared to traditional and Votar system". The study also shows that for "learning, understanding, participation during class, ease and integration of tools are higher for Wooclap and Socrative compared to Votar and traditional lesson with no significant difference between these 2 tools". During the study, the main difference between each interactive EdTech was that "Wooclap allowed students to ask questions directly through the website or application".

When describing various EdTechs, the study deemed that "money wise, Wooclap app is the most expensive and is very limited in its free use (only 30 students per session). Free license software Votar seems to be the most interesting if we do not want to use a complete system and ask only a few simple questions during a lesson. One of the important advantages of Votar is that its use requires very few materials".

2019-10-02 
A study in Morocco that evaluated the familiarity and effectiveness of interactive learning sites with English teachers.  The Wooclap app was effectively used in order to elevate the amount of participation in the classroom. The study also found that Wooclap was "the  least  known  interactive  learning site among the participants" out of "Kahoot!, Quizlet, Quizalize, Wooclap, and Jeopardylabs".

2021-06-07 
A study focused on gathering "feedback of students, who followed microbiology lessons between October and December 2020. The questionnaire, to which they responded, focused (1) on their experience of DL and (2) on the use of Wooclap®, an online ARS allowing students to participate in various activities". A result of the study was that "most of the students were very positive about the ease of use and the interest of Wooclap® in traditional learnings as well as in DL".

References 

Statistical survey software
Educational technology